Tommi Mikael Hartonen (born May 12, 1977 in Helsinki) is a retired Finnish sprinter. He holds the Finnish national records at men's 100 m and 200 m. He won national championship in 100m run four times, 2000, 2001, 2002 and 2004. He also was 400m champion once. His personal trainer was Markus Hartonen. He is nicknamed Suomen nopein.

Progression

100m

200 m

Personal bests
 60 m (indoor): 6.71 in Turku, 2005
 100 m: 10.21 in Vaasa, 2001
 200 m: 20.47 in Sydney, 2000
 400 m: 47.22 in Helsinki, 1997

Physical characteristics
 Height: 189 cm (6'2"ft)
 Weight: 85 kg (187lbs)

References
Tilastopaja Oy
sports-reference

External links

1977 births
Living people
Athletes from Helsinki
Finnish male sprinters
Olympic athletes of Finland
Athletes (track and field) at the 2000 Summer Olympics